, is a Japanese singer-songwriter and musician. A graduate of Rikkyo University, Sano is a frontman with a history of performing in several bands which feature music both in Japanese and occasionally, English, playing songs that often have a rock and roll sound to them. In 2007, Rolling Stone Japan ranked his album Someday number 11 on a list of the greatest Japanese rock albums of all time.

Additionally, he has spent a year in New York City, even doing a radio show there.

Sano took part in a special two-day concert commemorating Takashi Matsumoto's 45th anniversary as a lyricist held at the Tokyo International Forum on August 21–22, 2015. He performed lead vocals on "Haikara Hakuchi" with the surviving members of Happy End, Matsumoto, Haruomi Hosono and Shigeru Suzuki, in place of the deceased Eiichi Ohtaki.

Discography (Albums)
Back to the Street(1980)
HeartBeat (1981)
Someday (1982)
No Damage (1983)
Visitors (1984)
Cafe Bohemia (1986)
Heartland (1988)
NapoleonFish Day (1989)
Time Out! (1990)
Slow Songs (1991)
Sweet16 (1992)
No Damage2 (1992)
The Circle (1993)
The Golden Ring (1994)
Fruits (1996)
The Barn (1997)
Stones and Eggs (1999)
The 20th Anniversary Edition (2000)
Club Mix Collection (2000)
Grass (2000)
Spoken Words Collected Poems 1985–2000 (2000)
In Motion 2001(2002)
Someday Collector's Edition (2002)
The Legend Early Days of Motoharu Sano (2003)
Visitors 20th Anniversary Edition (2004)
In Motion 2003 (2004)
The Sun (2004)
The Sun Studio Edition (2005)
The Sun Live at NHK Hall (2005)
The Singles (2006)
The Essential Cafe Bohemia (2006)
Coyote (2007)
Beatitude (2007)
NapoleonFish Day Special Edition (2008)
Very Best of Motoharu Sano (2010)
SideWalk Talk (2011)
Zooey (2013)
Tokyo Chic (2014)
Visitors Deluxe Edition (2014)
Blood Moon (2015)
Maniju (2017)

Listening

External links 

  
Official myspace page 

1956 births
Japanese record producers
Japanese rock musicians
Japanese male musicians
Japanese male singer-songwriters
Japanese singer-songwriters
Japanese guitarists
Living people
Singers from Tokyo
Rikkyo University alumni
20th-century Japanese musicians
20th-century guitarists
20th-century Japanese male singers
20th-century Japanese singers